Alburnus mandrensis is a species of ray-finned fish in the genus Alburnus. The species is restricted only to the drainage of Lake Mandras in Bulgaria. It is threatened by pollution (domestic and industrial) and the impoundment of spawning streams.

References

mandrensis
Fish described in 1943
Cyprinid fish of Europe
Endemic fauna of Bulgaria